Aliou Dia (born 30 May 1990 in Roubaix, France) is a French footballer who last played for Brussels. Before, Dia has played 17 matches for Mons of the Belgian Pro League, the top league of football in Belgium.

References

External links

French footballers
French sportspeople of Malian descent
Sportspeople from Roubaix
1990 births
Living people
Royal Excel Mouscron players
R.A.E.C. Mons players
R.W.D.M. Brussels F.C. players
Belgian Pro League players
Challenger Pro League players
French expatriate sportspeople in Belgium
Expatriate footballers in Belgium
Association football defenders
Footballers from Hauts-de-France